Bristol Constabulary, also called Bristol City Police, was a police force responsible for policing the city of Bristol in south-west England from its foundation in 1835 until 1974, when it was amalgamated under the Local Government Act 1972 with Somerset and Bath Constabulary and parts of the Gloucestershire Constabulary to form the Avon and Somerset Constabulary.

At the time of its formation, Bristol Constabulary had an establishment of 232 officers, and was led by Superintendent Joseph Bishop, who had been appointed from the Metropolitan Police.  By 1866 the force had grown to 296 officers, and by 1945 to 814.  At the time of its amalgamation into the Avon and Somerset Constabulary on 1 April 1974, the force had 1247 officers.

Unlike most city forces, the force was officially a constabulary, the usual name given to county forces, since Bristol was a county as well as a city.

Archives
Records of the Bristol Constabulary and Avon and Somerset Constabulary are held at Bristol Archives (Ref. Pol) (online catalogue).

References

Defunct police forces of England
History of Bristol